Tazeh Kand-e Hajj Hasan (also Romanized as Tāzeh Kand-e Ḩājj Ḩasan; also known as Tāzeh Kand) is a village in Zarrineh Rud Rural District, in the Central District of Miandoab County, West Azerbaijan Province, Iran. At the 2006 census, its population was 99, in 20 families.

References 

Populated places in Miandoab County